Pecadora may refer to:

 "Pecadora" (song), a song by Lila Downs
Pecadora (film), a 1956 Argentine film
 Pecadora (telenovela), a Venezuelan telenovela